Hugh Wynn (1897–1936) was an American film editor. He was employed by the Hollywood studio MGM from 1924 until his sudden death in 1936.

Filmography

 The Wife of the Centaur (1924)
 He Who Gets Slapped (1924)
 Confessions of a Queen (1925)
The Big Parade (1925)
 The Scarlet Letter (1926)
 Valencia (1926)
 La Bohème (1926)
 The Callahans and the Murphys (1927)
 Women Love Diamonds (1927)
 Love (1927)
 The Patsy (1928)
 Show People (1928)
 The Crowd (1928)
 The Cameraman (1928)
 Navy Blues (1929)
 Hallelujah (1929)
 Romance (1930)
 Paid (1930)
 The Divorcee (1930)
 Anna Christie (1930)
Billy the Kid (1930)
 Strangers May Kiss (1931)
 A Free Soul (1931)
 The Champ (1931)
 Huddle (1932)
 Faithless (1932)
 Fast Life (1932)
 Arsène Lupin (1932)
 Another Language (1933)
 Clear All Wires! (1933)
 Should Ladies Behave (1933)
 Christopher Bean (1933)
 When Ladies Meet (1933)
 Looking forward (1933)
 Stamboul Quest (1934)
 The Painted Veil (1934)
 The Mystery of Mr. X (1934)
 Sadie McKee (1934)
 Kind Lady (1935)
 The Winning Ticket (1935)
 Age of Indiscretion (1935)
 Mad Love (1935)
 Times Square Lady (1935)
 Rendezvous (1935)

References

Bibliography
 Beauchamp, Cari . Without Lying Down: Frances Marion and the Powerful Women of Early Hollywood. University of California Press, 1998.
 Clark, Mark. Smirk, Sneer and Scream: Great Acting in Horror Cinema. McFarland, 2003. 
 Neibaur, James L. The Fall of Buster Keaton: His Films for MGM, Educational Pictures, and Columbia. Scarecrow Press, 2010.

External links

1897 births
1936 deaths
American film editors
People from Pasadena, California